Sigismund of Lithuania may refer to:
 Sigismund Kęstutaitis (ca. 1365 – 1440), Grand Duke Sigismund I of Lithuania
 Sigismund I the Old of Poland (1467–1548), who was also Grand Duke Sigismund II of Lithuania
 Sigismund II Augustus (1520–1572), King of Poland and Grand Duke Sigismund III of Lithuania
 Sigismund III Vasa (1566–1632 N.S.), head of the Polish-Lithuanian Commonwealth

See also 
 Sigismund (disambiguation)
 Sigmund (disambiguation)